Mnemonic is a play created by the British theatre company Complicite. It uses several interrelated stories to explore the subject of memory.

Synopsis

Mnemonic begins with a lecture by the director, who encourages the audience to try to recall past memories. It then tells two parallel stories: in one, a man named Virgil tries to find his girlfriend, Alice, who has run away to Europe to hunt for her long-lost father; the other relates the discovery of Ötzi the Iceman, a 5,000-year-old mummified corpse. Through recurring images and situations the play draws parallels between these stories, focusing on the theme of the role of the imagination in recapturing the past.

Characters

 Simon/Virgil : Starts off acting as the play's 'director' Simon but, from the eighth page onwards, plays as Virgil. Virgil is a British man who is at first trying to come to terms with his girlfriend, Alice, leaving him. He then ends up trying to find and reconcile with her. Also at points during the play can be portrayed to resemble the ice-man from the parallel story.
 Alice : Virgil's girlfriend who has left him and is now travelling through Europe in an attempt to find her long-lost father.
 Spindler: Based on real-life archaeologist Konrad Spindler, this is the main professor conducting research into the recently discovered ice-man.
 Simonides: Named after the creator of mnemonics, Simonides of Ceos, he is a migrant taxi-driver who throughout the play talks about the never-ending economic migration in Europe.
 BBC Man: A BBC reporter that Alice meets on a train whilst travelling through Europe. He reveals to her that her father might have been a Jew and teaches her about the culture. It is implied that they have sex - this cannot be known for sure as this might have just been shown through Virgil's imagination.

References

"Mnemonic", in Complicite:Plays One (Methuen, 2003)

1999 plays